Lozotaenia capensana, the Cape roller or apple leafroller, is a species of moth of the family Tortricidae. It is found in Gambia, Malawi, Mozambique, Zimbabwe, South Africa (KwaZulu-Natal, the Western Cape and Gauteng) and on Saint Helena in the South Atlantic.

The larvae feed on Chrysanthemoides monilifera, Passiflora mollisima, Lycium ferocissimum, Pinus radiata, Pinus patula, Pericallis × hybrida, Calendula, Malus, Pyrus, Tacsonia, Fragaria and Citrus species.

References

Moths described in 1863
Archipini